PsychOpen is a European Open-Access publishing platform for Psychology operated by the research support organization Leibniz Institute for Psychology Information (ZPID), which combines traditional scientific and Internet-based publishing. PsychOpen aims to foster the visibility of psychological research in Europe and beyond, and to ensure free access to research for scholars and professionals in the field.

Mission 
PsychOpen is free of charge and open to all areas of psychology and its related disciplines including scholarly as well as professional publications. The publication types published include research articles, clinical reports, monographs, etc. in English as well as other languages like Portuguese and Bulgarian.  All content is enriched with English metadata (title, keywords and abstracts) and free of charge for authors, editors and readers.

Publications 
PsychOpen publishes the following international Open-Access journals (effective August 2013):
 Europe's Journal of Psychology
 Journal of Social and Political Psychology
 Interpersona: An International Journal on Personal Relationships
 Psychological Thought
 Psychology, Community & Health
 The European Journal of Counselling Psychology
 Social Psychological Bulletin

Technical Infrastructure 
The Leibniz Institute for Psychology Information provides the technical infrastructure. PsychOpen uses Open Journal Systems, an open-source software specifically developed for the management of peer-reviewed academic journals.

Memberships
PsychOpen is a member of CLOCKSS, CrossRef and OASPA, the Open Access Scholarly Publishers Association.

Links

References 

Academic journal online publishing platforms
Open access projects